Waterfront at Midnight is a 1948 American film noir crime film directed by William Berke, written by Bernard Girard and starring William Gargan, Mary Beth Hughes, Richard Travis, Richard Crane, Cheryl Walker and Horace McMahon. It was released on June 25, 1948 by Paramount Pictures.

Plot 

A detective mistakenly shoots his own brother who has become a criminal involved with a dangerous boss.

Cast 
William Gargan as Mike Hanrohan
Mary Beth Hughes as Ethel Novack
Richard Travis as 'Socks' Barstow
Richard Crane as Denny Hanrohan
Cheryl Walker as Helen Hanrohan
Horace McMahon as Hank Bremmer
John Hart as Woody
Douglas Fowley as Joe Sargus
Paul Harvey as Commissioner Ryan
Keye Luke as Loy

References

External links 
 

1948 films
1940s English-language films
Paramount Pictures films
Film noir
American crime drama films
1948 crime drama films
Films directed by William A. Berke
American black-and-white films
1940s American films